Kirill Artyomovich Glebov (born 10 November 2005) is a Russian football player who plays as a right winger or left winger for CSKA Moscow.

Club career
He made his debut in the Russian Premier League for CSKA Moscow on 5 March 2023 in a game against Sochi.

References

External links
 
 
 

2005 births
Sportspeople from Chelyabinsk
Living people
Russian footballers
Russia youth international footballers
Association football forwards
PFC CSKA Moscow players
Russian Premier League players